Kingston (Norf'k: Daun a'Taun) is the administrative centre of the Australian external territory of Norfolk Island.  The Norfolk Island Regional Council is based in Kingston. The settlement is the second-oldest in Australia, founded a little over a month after Sydney. It is part of the Kingston and Arthur's Vale Historic Area World Heritage site.

Geography
Watermill Creek traverses the plain after leaving Arthur's Vale to the north-west, and is joined by Town Creek and several minor tributaries to form the Kingston swamps before draining into Emily Bay. Most of the accessible beaches on the island are located along the Kingston foreshores. Southwards, Emily Bay and Slaughter Bay open into the Kingston lagoon and reefs and the broad expanse of Sydney Bay. Eastwards, Cemetery Bay opens directly into the South Pacific Ocean.

History 
The town was founded on 6 March 1788 by Lieutenant Philip Gidley King and 22 settlers (including 9 male and 6 female convicts) who landed that day from HMS Supply.  They had sailed from Port Jackson  just a few weeks after the establishment of the British colony of New South Wales.  The settlement was initially known as Sidney or Sydney Bay, and by 1796 was being called the Town of Sydney, in honour of Viscount Sydney, British Home Secretary and patron of the First Fleet. King established a house on the hill over the town, but the mass of roots in the ground caused him to call it "rooty hill", which name was also later transferred to Rooty Hill, New South Wales when King later established a house there.

Urban form 
The old town dating from 1788 occupies several winding irregular lanes at the head of Kingston Pier.  The modern town, as laid out by the Royal Engineers during the 1830s, consists of a Roman-style grid plan.  There are two long east west roads: Bay Street along the foreshore and Quality Row, the town's principal thoroughfare, along the foothills.  These two boulevards are connected by short cross streets of Pier Street,  Bounty Street, and the former Bligh Street (now part of the drive to Government House).  Stone bridges carry these streets across Watermill Creek.  Four roads wind upcountry from the edges of the grid: Country Road, Middlegate Road, Rooty Hill Road, and Driver Christian Road.  All the buildings are located either in the old town or along the Quality Row, with the exception of Government House which is located on a small knoll called Dove's Plot Hill. The middle and west of the plain forms the Kingston Common and Kingston Recreation Ground, with the golf links occupying the eastern end, and Kingston Cemetery in the northeast.  This broad greensward with the Kingston swamp in its centre separates the two long boulevards.

Municipal governance 
Municipal government functions on Norfolk Island are the responsibility of the Norfolk Island Regional Council, based in the New Military Barracks in Kingston.

Nearby towns and hamlets
The uninhabited Nepean Island and Phillip Island are prominent in the sea view from Kingston.

Notable sites in Kingston and nearby 
 Causeway to HMS Sirius wrecksite, 1790 (exposed at low tide)
 Marine Barracks 1792, now Civil Hospital ruins 1831
 Swamp Canal 1795
 Stone building 1796, now the Guardhouse 1826
 Government House 1804
 Piper's Boatshed 1808, now the Double Boatshed 1826
 Kingston Cemetery 1825
 Commissariat Granary 1827, now the Crankmill ruin
 Prisoner's Barracks 1829, now the Compound 1960s
 The Officer's Bath 1832
 Old Military Barracks 1832, home of the Legislative Assembly 1979-2005
 Bounty Street Bridge 1832
 Pier Street Bridge 1834
 Commissariat Store 1835, now All Saints Church 1874
 New Military Barracks 1836, now the Administration Offices 1926
 Kingston Pier 1839
 New Gaol ruins 1847
 Salt House ruins 1848
 Royal Engineer's Office 1851, now REO Cafe 1984
 Queen Elizabeth Lookout 1974
 Kingston Common
 Emily Bay
 Slaughter Bay
 Cemetery Bay
 Lone Pine and Point Hunter
 Flagstaff Hill
 Arthur's Vale

Gallery

References

External links 

Kingston and Arthurs Vale Historic Area
Kingston

 
Populated places in Norfolk Island
Capitals in Oceania
Populated places established in 1788
1788 establishments in Australia